Never Fade is the second extended play (EP) by English singer-songwriter Gabrielle Aplin. The EP was self-released by Aplin on 9 May 2011. It was then re-released by the record label which Aplin founded, Never Fade Records, on 12 February 2013. The EP includes the original version of the song "Panic Cord", which was re-recorded and included on Aplin's debut studio album English Rain.

Track listing

References

2017 EPs
Gabrielle Aplin albums